Roald Dahl's Esio Trot is a British made-for-television comedy film that was first broadcast as part of BBC One's 2015 Christmas programming. It is an adaptation of Roald Dahl's 1990 children's novel Esio Trot in which a retired bachelor falls in love with his neighbour, a widow, who keeps a tortoise as a companion after the death of her husband.

Featuring Dustin Hoffman and Judi Dench as the couple, with James Corden as another neighbour, who acts as the narrator, it was broadcast on 1 January 2015. It was seen by 7.86 million viewers, making it the ninth-most watched programme on BBC1 and across all UK TV channels for the week ending 4 January 2015. It was repeated on BBC1 on 31 December 2015 and on BBC2 on 30 December 2016.

Cast
 Judi Dench as Mrs Lavinia Silver
 Dustin Hoffman as Mr Henry Hoppy
 James Corden as The Narrator
 Richard Cordery as Mr Pringle
 Pixie Davies as Roberta
 Geoffrey McGivern as the Pet Shop Owner
 Jimmy Akingbola as the keen Pet Shop Owner
 Lisa Hammond as Mrs Desmond
Anna Cannings as Mrs Court
Joseph West as Philip
 Katie Lyons as Philip's Mother
Polly Kemp as the woman on Bus
 Pik-Sen Lim as Mrs Wu
Salo Gardner as Mr Mavrokoukoudopolous
Emily Ralph as the little Girl

Music

The musical score is by composer Tim Phillips.  All the commercial music used in the show is that of New Orleans jazz singer and trumpeter Louis Armstrong and his All-Stars; which include Edmond Hall, Trummy Young, Billy Kyle, Arvell Shaw & Barrett Deems.

Differences from Dahl's novel
Mr Pringle (Hoppy's rival for the affections of Mrs Silver) does not appear in the novel.
In the novel, Mr Hoppy's ruse of switching tortoises to fool Mrs Silver into thinking that hers is growing is successful and she never discovers the truth. In the movie, she discovers Mr Hoppy's plan but eventually marries him anyway.

Production
Charlotte Moore announced the television film at the Edinburgh International Television Festival on 22 August 2013. It was produced by Hilary Bevan Jones and directed by Dearbhla Walsh. Bevan Jones said: "To bring together two of the world’s favourite actors in Dame Judi and Dustin is a dream come true. Richard and Paul have captured the magic of Roald Dahl’s wonderful tale and I am thrilled that Dearbhla is to direct it." It was adapted by Richard Curtis and Paul Mayhew-Archer, and filming took place in May 2014 in London. The apartment block featured in the film is Adelaide Wharf in Haggerston.

Reviews
The adaptation received praise, with Lucy Mangan in The Guardian writing, “an utterly, completely, inescapably beguiling adaptation of Roald Dahl’s book by Richard Curtis and Paul Mayhew-Archer, directed by Dearbhla Walsh, narrated by James Corden and starring Dustin Hoffman and Judi Dench. You could argue that with a pedigree like that nothing could have gone wrong, but it doesn’t work like that. Although you can maximise your chances of being able to conjure it, charm is ineffable, alchemical. You can’t measure it out by the yard and cut it off when you’ve got enough. You can’t splash it on to a scene and then stopper it to make sure you’ve got enough for the next take. It just … appears, if you’re careful and if you’re lucky. And then it ripples through your film, or your play or your book, animating all and subtly transforming everything from a prosaic good – or even great – into a thing of wonder.”

Awards

References

External links
 
 

British television films
Films based on British novels
Films based on children's books
Films based on works by Roald Dahl
Films about turtles
Films shot in England
Films about pets
English-language television shows
Films with screenplays by Richard Curtis
2015 television films
2015 films
2010s English-language films